Louie Bello (born December 30) is an American Boston-born singer and songwriter. He is also the former Sony ATV writer and Boston award winner who can be seen on venues around the country from Boston to Texas. He has written and performed with dozens of National Recording Artists and he is the writer and performer of the title song for the ESPN documentary, PUSH. He has performed in local and national music festivals, such as Boston Fest Red Gorilla Festival, SXSW, Phantom Gourmet's Summer BBQ. His songs are placed on major networks such as VH1-The Kardashians, ABC-Lincoln Heights.

References

American male pop singers
Songwriters from Massachusetts
American male songwriters
Living people
Year of birth missing (living people)